Eldrid Lunden (born 5 October 1940) is a Norwegian poet, and 1996 became Norway's first professor in creative writing, at Telemark University College. She was awarded the Dobloug Prize in 1989, and the Brage Prize honorary award in 2000. 

Lunden belonged to the circle surrounding the modernist literary magazine Profil.

She was born in Naustdal and took her cand.philol. degree at the University of Oslo. She is a sister of Kåre Lunden.

Lunden married 1994 the Swedish literary scholar and poet Reidar Ekner and lived with him in Telemark till he died 2014.

Awards 
Nynorsk Literature Prize 1982 
Dobloug Prize 1989
Aschehougprisen 1992
Brage Prize 2000 – honorary award
Nordiska Pris 2021

References

1940 births
Living people
Norwegian women poets
People from Naustdal
University of Oslo alumni
Academic staff of Telemark University College
Dobloug Prize winners
Nynorsk-language writers
Norwegian women academics